A/W 95 may ref to:

A-B Helicopters A/W 95, an American helicopter design
Vortech A/W 95, an American helicopter design